Desha may refer to:

Films
Desha: The Leader, a 2014 Bangladeshi film, directed by Saikat Nasir.

People
Benjamin Desha, American soldier and politician
Joseph Desha (1768–1842), US Representative and the ninth governor of Kentucky
Lucius Desha Bunton III (1924–2001), US federal judge
Robert Desha, American politician who represented Tennessee's 5th Congressional district in the US House of Representatives
As a given name:
Desha Breckinridge (1867–1935), American newspaper editor and publisher
Desha Delteil (1892–1965), American dancer and artist model

Places
Desha County, Arkansas, county located in the US state of Arkansas
Payne-Desha House, historic house located on land west of Royal Spring Branch near downtown Georgetown, Kentucky, USA
Desha is another spelling of the Indian region Desh, Maharashtra

Politics
Desha Vimukthi Janatha Pakshaya (National Liberation People's Party) is a political party in Sri Lanka
Desha Vimukthi Janatha Party (National Liberation People's Party) is a political party in Sri Lanka

Other
Desha Putra Sammanaya, Sri Lankan military decoration awarded to those who are killed or wounded in combat